These Things Happen is the debut studio album by American progressive electronic composer and percussionist David Van Tieghem, released in 1984 by Warner Bros. Records. Van Tieghem produced the album himself, and it was recorded at four separate recording studios in New York City, which were Battery Sound, Right Track Recording, Public Access Synthesizer Studio and Rosewood Sound.

Although not his first musical work, it was his first proper album, notorious for Van Tieghem's use of percussion objects such as radio transmissions, a wine bottle, hair comb, metal ashtrays and balloons. It was commissioned for the dance "Fait Accompli", choreographed and directed by Twyla Tharp.

After its original release, the album remained out of print on any format for many years. However, the album became available in 2017 via online MP3 download on Bandcamp.

Track listing

Personnel
Credits are adapted from the These Things Happen liner notes.

Musicians
 David Van Tieghem – drums; percussion; electronic rhythm generators; digital and analog synthesizers; piano; marimba; cymbal; organ; synthesizer drums; vibraphone; saucepan; wine bottle; ceramic hand drums; cassettes; whistle; wooden tongue drum; tambourine; nipple gongs; hair comb; metal ashtrays; raygun; drafting stool; scrap metal; balloons; steel drums; voice; processor programming
 Peter Gordon – tenor saxophone; baritone saxophone; E-flat clarinet; synthesizer
 Rik Albani – trumpet; flugelhorn
 Rebecca Armstrong – voice
 Peter J. Gordon – French horn
 Eric Liljestrand – guitar
 Randy Gun – guitar
 Ron Robboy – cello; violin
 Richard Landry – alto saxophone
 Ned Sublette – pedal steel guitar 
 Richard J. Van Tieghem – shortwave radio
 Leanne Ungar – processor programming
 Paul Shorr – processor programming

Technical
 David Van Tieghem – producer; additional engineering
 Leanne Ungar – engineer
 Paul Shorr – engineer
 Mark Freedman – additional engineering
 Peter Gordon – additional engineering
 Eric Liljestrand – assistant engineer
 Moira Marquis – assistant engineer
 Tim Crich – assistant engineer
 Tom Gartland – assistant engineer
 Bill Kipper – mastering engineer

Artwork
 Deborah Feingold – cover photograph
 Jo Bonney – cover design

References

External links
 

1984 debut albums
David Van Tieghem albums
Warner Records albums